Mouty Ousseni (born 3 April 1986 in Sèvres (Hauts-de-Seine) is a French footballer, who currently is free.

Career
He debuted in Athletic Club de Boulogne-Billancourt, than played in FC Versailles 78 and Paris Saint-Germain F.C. In January 2010, he signed his first professional contract in Singapore with the Etoile FC. With Etoile FC, he won the League Cup and the championship of the S.League.

References

Living people
1986 births
French footballers
Expatriate footballers in Singapore
Association football midfielders
Expatriate footballers in Burkina Faso
Étoile FC players